Rabiah may refer to:
Rabiah ibn Kab, a companion of Muhammad
Ayyash ibn Abi Rabiah, a companion of Muhammad
Utbah ibn Rabi'ah (c.563–624), a Quraish leader
Rabiah ibn Mudhar, a 6th-century Jewish king in present-day Yemen
Abd ar-Rahman ibn Rabiah, a 7th-century caliphate general
Salman ibn Rabiah (died 650), a military governor of Armenia
Rabiah Hutchinson (born 1954), an Australian Islamic leader
Fouad Mahmoud al Rabiah (born 1959), a Kuwaiti national formerly imprisoned at Guantanamo Bay
Robert Rabiah, an Australian film actor and writer
Tawfig Al-Rabiah, a Saudi health minister
Rabiah, the fictional setting of Arabian Nights, the first Magic: The Gathering expansion

See also
Rabia (disambiguation)
Al-Rabiaa, a village in northwestern Syria
Rabieh, a suburb of Beirut